John Curtis Chamberlain (June 5, 1772December 8, 1834) was an American attorney and Federalist politician in the U.S. state of New Hampshire who served as a member of the United States House of Representatives and as a member of the New Hampshire House of Representatives.

Early life
Chamberlain was born in Worcester in the Province of Massachusetts Bay. He graduated from Harvard University in 1793. He read law, being superintended by Benjamin West of Charleston. He was admitted to the bar in 1796 and began practicing law in Alstead, New Hampshire.

Career
Chamberlain wrote a series of essays as The Hermit which appeared for a year or more in "The Farmer's Museum" beginning in the summer of 1796. He also was ghost writer for Mrs. Susanna Willard Johnson's "A Narrative of the Captivity of Mrs. Johnson" in 1796. He was a member of the New Hampshire House of Representatives from 1802–1804. In 1804, he moved to Charlestown, New Hampshire becoming partners with Benjamin West until West's death in 1817.

Elected as a Federalist to the Eleventh Congress, Chamberlain served as United States Representative for the state of New Hampshire from March 4, 1809 to March 3, 1811. After leaving Congress he resumed the practice of law. He served as a member of the New Hampshire House of Representatives again in 1818. He continued his practice until he moved in 1826 to Utica, New York.

Chamberlain was elected a member of the American Antiquarian Society in 1815.

Death
Chamberlain died in Utica, Oneida County, New York on December 8, 1834 (age 62 years, 186 days). He is interred at Mt. Albion Cemetery, Albion, Orleans County, New York.

Family life
Son of John and Mary Curtis Chamberlain, he married Nancy Hubbard on December 29, 1797; and they had nine children, Mary, Nancy Hubbard, John, Hubbard, William, Elizabeth Jane, Richard Hubbard, Harriett Prudence, and George.

References

External links

	

1772 births
1834 deaths
Politicians from Worcester, Massachusetts
Harvard University alumni
Federalist Party members of the United States House of Representatives from New Hampshire
Members of the American Antiquarian Society
American lawyers admitted to the practice of law by reading law
People from Alstead, New Hampshire